An overview of the Fat Wreck Chords compilations

Fat Music for Fat People - (1994)
Survival of the Fattest - (1996)
Physical Fatness- (1997)
Life in the Fat Lane - (1999)
Short Music for Short People - (1999)
Live Fat, Die Young- (2001)
Uncontrollable Fatulence - (2002)
Liberation: Songs to Benefit PETA - (2003)
Rock Against Bush, Vol. 1 - (2004)
Rock Against Bush, Vol. 2 -(2004)
PROTECT: A Benefit for the National Association to Protect Children - (2005)
Wrecktrospective - (2009)
Harder, Fatter + Louder! - (2010)
Going Nowhere Fat - (2015)
Mild in the Streets: Fat Music Unplugged (2016)
Free Coaster (2018)

Floyd promos
Free samplers that were given out. Most album titles and covers are parodies of well-known punk albums.
 If Life Is A Bowl Of Cherries...Why Is Floyd Always In The Pit? (1999)
 More RPM's Than Floyd on a Scooter (2000)
 Floyd... And Out Come the Teeth (2001)
Parody of ...And Out Come the Wolves (1995) by Rancid
 The Thing That Floyd Ate (2001)
Parody of The Thing That Ate Floyd (Lookout! Records compilation)
 Floyd: Squawk Among Us (2002)
Parody of Walk Among Us (1982) by The Misfits
 The Exfloyded (2003)
Parody of On Stage by The Exploited
 Anti-Floyd - The Terrier State (2004)
Parody of The Terror State (2003) by Anti-Flag
 Rock Against Floyd (2005)
Parody of Fat Wrecks' own Rock Against Bush, Vol. 1 compilation
 Land Of The Rising Floyd (2007)

Digital samplers
Starting in 2006, Fat Wreck moved to distribute their annual free compilations online.
 iFloyd (2006)
A take-off of iTunes, as it was only released digitally via their website
 X-Mas Bonus (2006)
Fat Wreck's second digital sampler, available on their website, with corresponding podcast episode
 Hanuk-COMP: From the Dreidel to the Grave (2007)
 Fat Wreck's third digital sampler, and second to come out for the holidays, with corresponding podcast episode

Fat Wreck Chords
Record label compilation albums
Fat Wreck Chords